Conus vittatus, common name the ribboned cone, is a species of sea snail, a marine gastropod mollusk in the family Conidae, the cone snails and their allies.

Like all species within the genus Conus, these snails are predatory and venomous. They are capable of "stinging" humans, therefore live ones should be handled carefully or not at all.

Description
The size of the shell varies between 22 mm and 50 mm. The color of the shell is pink-brown, maculated or strigated longitudinally with light chestnut, with chestnut-dotted revolving striae, and a ceritall white, chestnut maculated band. The convex spire is maculated with chestnut.

Distribution
This marine species occurs in the Gulf of California, Western Mexico to the Pacific Ocean off Ecuador

References

 Kiener L.C. 1844–1850. Spécies général et iconographie des coquilles vivantes. Vol. 2. Famille des Enroulées. Genre Cone (Conus, Lam.), pp. 1–379, pl. 1–111 [pp. 1–48 (1846); 49–160 (1847); 161–192 (1848); 193–240 (1849); 241-[379](assumed to be 1850); plates 4,6 (1844); 2–3, 5, 7–32, 34–36, 38, 40–50 (1845); 33, 37, 39, 51–52, 54–56, 57–68, 74–77 (1846); 1, 69–73, 78–103 (1847); 104–106 (1848); 107 (1849); 108–111 (1850)]. Paris, Rousseau & J.B. Baillière

External links
 The Conus Biodiversity website
 Cone Shells – Knights of the Sea
 

vittatus
Gastropods described in 1792